The Storm Clouds Cantata (or Storm Cloud Cantata) is a cantata by the Australian composer Arthur Benjamin.

This cantata was written for the assassination scene in the Alfred Hitchcock 1934 film, The Man Who Knew Too Much, in the Royal Albert Hall. In the film version of 1934, the London Symphony Orchestra was directed by H. Wynn Reeves. In the 1956 version, however, the London Symphony Orchestra was conducted by Bernard Herrmann, the composer of new music for the remake, and the chorus is the Covent Garden Opera Chorus with  soloist Barbara Howitt.

The Cantata is 177 measures and runs 8-9 minutes. It starts with a Lento in three-quarter time in C major. The first half of the cantata is Lento, at 108 beats per minute. Then begins the Allegro agitato, characterized by rhythmic strokes of the timpani. The conclusion is Presto.

Orchestra

 Piccolo
 Flute
 Oboe
 Clarinet
 Bass Clarinet
 Bassoon
 Contrabassoon
 Horn
 Trumpet
 Tenor Trombone
 Bass Trombone
 Tuba
 Timpani
 Snare drum
 Cymbals
 Bass drum
 Harp
 Organ
 1st/2nd violins
 Viola
 Cello
 Contrabasses
 Mezzo-soprano solo
 Chorus SATB

Text 
D. B. Wyndham-Lewis, screenplay The Man who Knew Too Much. This appears to be his only actual contribution to the screenplay although he is credited as co-author.

Soloist:
There came a whispered terror on the breeze.
And the dark forest shook

Chorus:
And on the trembling trees came nameless fear.
And panic overtook each flying creature of the wild
Original: ...flying creature of the wind
And when they all had fled

Soloist:
All save the child — all save the child.
Around whose head screaming,
The night-birds wheeled and shot away.

Chorus:
Finding release from that which drove them onward like their prey.
Finding release the storm-clouds broke.
And drowned the dying moon.
The storm-clouds broke — the storm clouds broke.
Finding release!

Addition for the 1956 remake
Yet stood the trees — yet stood the trees
Around whose heads screaming

The singers perform in an alternation between male and female:
Finding release;
Finding release from that which drove them onward like their prey.

This last part is part of the poco crescendo played by the Tympani to culminate in the Maestoso in the finale which ends with the cymbal crash in which the assassin shoots.

Publication
The full score of the Storm Clouds Cantata has never been published.  A piano arrangement of the latter half of the work was published in 2014 in the collection Music From the Hitchcock Films.

Recording
A recording of the complete 1954 version [i.e. with Herrmann's embellishments] is included on the CD Elmer Bernstein conducts the Royal Philharmonic Orchestra: Bernard Herrmann Film Scores - from Citizen Kane to Taxi Driver (1992).

See also 
 Alfred Hitchcock
 The Man Who Knew Too Much (1934)
 The Man Who Knew Too Much (1956)
 Royal Albert Hall
 London Symphony Orchestra
 Bernard Herrmann

References

Alfred Hitchcock
Cantatas
Film music
Compositions by Arthur Benjamin